Dyschirius sevanensis is a species of ground beetle in the subfamily Scaritinae. It was described by Iablokoff-Khnzorian in 1962.

References

sevanensis
Beetles described in 1962